The Best of the Doors is a compilation album by the American rock band the Doors, released in September 1973 by Elektra Records. It was the third compilation album to be released by the band and contains seven of the Doors' eight Top 40 hits.

Critical reception

Critic Robert Christgau gave the compilation a "B" rating, while AllMusic's William Ruhlmann rated it four and a half out of five stars. The latter commented that at the time of its release, "it was the best Doors greatest-hits collection on the market", but noted that most of the material is found on the more comprehensive The Best of the Doors first released in 1985.

Releases

The songs on the album were re-mixed for four channel quadraphonic sound and the album was originally released on LP in the CD-4 Quadradisc format. The album was also released on quadraphonic 8-Track tape and Reel-to-reel tape formats. In 1980, the LP was reissued in a two-channel stereo version through the Columbia House record club.

In 2015, Audio Fidelity released the original quadraphonic mix of The Best of the Doors in the hybrid Super Audio CD format. Steve Hoffman mastered the release at Marsh Mastering. This version also contains the same content in stereo.

In 2017, the quad mix was released on Blu-Ray Audio, in the triple disc edition of the compilation The Singles.

Track listing
All tracks are written by the Doors (Jim Morrison, Ray Manzarek, Robby Krieger and John Densmore), except as noted.  Details are taken from the 1973 U.S. Elektra release; other releases may show different information.

Personnel
From the 1973 Elektra album:
 Jim Morrison – vocals
 Robbie Krieger – guitar
 Ray Manzarek – piano, organ, bass keyboards, marimba
 John Densmore – drums

References

1973 greatest hits albums
Albums produced by Paul A. Rothchild
The Doors compilation albums
Elektra Records compilation albums

pl:The Best of The Doors